Castelo de Paiva is a town and a municipality of the Aveiro District in Portugal. The population in 2011 was 16,733, in an area of 115.01 km2.

On 4 March 2001 at 9 pm, a 116-year-old metal bridge linking the parish/council of Sobrado (a.k.a. Castelo de Paiva) and Entre-os-Rios (a bridge connecting Castelo de Paiva to Penafiel) collapsed, killing 59 people, including those in a bus from the Asadouro company and three cars that were attempting to get to the other side of the Douro river. The Hintze Ribeiro Bridge disaster prompted accusations of government negligence, and the Public Works minister Jorge Coelho resigned shortly after the disaster. There is a monument near the bridge in honour of the people who died, known as the "Anjo de Portugal" (The Angel of Portugal).

The Mayor is Gonçalo Rocha, elected by the Socialist Party (PS). His term goes until 2021.

The municipal holiday is 24 June, Saint John's day.

Demographics

Parishes
Administratively, the municipality is divided into 6 civil parishes (freguesias):
 Fornos
 Raiva, Pedorido e Paraíso
 Real
 Santa Maria de Sardoura
 São Martinho de Sardoura
 Sobrado e Bairros

Points of interest 

 Câmara Municipal (Municipal Palace)
 Largo do Conde (Cont's Square)
 Douro River
 Passadiços do Paiva (Paiva Walkways)
 Paiva River

The Legend of Saint Anthony in Castelo de Paiva 
Researchers, archeologists and journalists have found documents that proves the connection between Saint Anthony of Padua and Castelo de Paiva. His parents, Martim de Bulhões, and D. Teresa Taveira were born in this council.

Other notable people 
 José Nunes (born 1977) a Portuguese former footballer with 501 club caps 
 Pedro Filipe Soares (born 1979) a Portuguese mathematician and politician 
 Sérgio Fernando da Silva Rodrigues (born 1985) known as Serginho, is a Portuguese footballer with over 300 club caps
 Marco Pereira (born 1987) known as Marco, a Portuguese footballer with over 330 club caps

References

External links
Town Hall official website
BBC News story: Portugal bridge collapse 'kills 70'

 
Municipalities of Aveiro District